United Nations Security Council Resolution 173, adopted unanimously on July 26, 1962, after examining the application of the Kingdom of Burundi for membership in the United Nations, the Council recommended to the General Assembly that the Kingdom of Burundi be admitted.

See also
List of United Nations Security Council Resolutions 101 to 200 (1953–1965)

References
Text of the Resolution at undocs.org

External links
 

 0173
1962 in Burundi
 0173
 0173
July 1962 events